The French colonial empire comprised the overseas colonies, protectorates and mandate territories that came under French rule from the 16th century onward. A distinction is generally made between the "First French Colonial Empire", that existed until 1814, by which time most of it had been lost or sold, and the "Second French Colonial Empire", which began with the conquest of Algiers in 1830. At its apex between the two world wars, the second French colonial empire was the second-largest colonial empire in the world behind the British Empire.

France began to establish colonies in North America, the Caribbean and India in the 17th century but lost most of its possessions following its defeat in the Seven Years' War. The North American possessions were lost to Britain and Spain but the latter returned Louisiana (New France) to France in 1800. The territory was then sold to the United States in 1803. France rebuilt a new empire mostly after 1850, concentrating chiefly in Africa as well as Indochina and the South Pacific. As it developed, the new French empire took on roles of trade with the metropole, supplying raw materials and purchasing manufactured items. Rebuilding an empire restored French prestige, especially regarding international power and spreading the French language and Catholicism. It also provided manpower in the world wars.

'Civilizing' the populations of Africa, through the spreading of the French language and Catholicism, were used as justifications for many of the practices that came with the French colonial project. In 1884, the leading proponent of colonialism, Jules Ferry, declared: "The higher races have a right over the lower races, they have a duty to civilize the inferior races." Full citizenship rights –  – were offered, although in reality "assimilation was always receding [and] the colonial populations treated like subjects not citizens." France sent small numbers of settlers to its empire, with the notable exception of Algeria, where the French settlers took power while being a minority.

In World War II, Charles de Gaulle and the Free French took control of the overseas colonies one-by-one and used them as bases from which they prepared to liberate France. Historian Tony Chafer argues: "In an effort to restore its world-power status after the humiliation of defeat and occupation, France was eager to maintain its overseas empire at the end of the Second World War." However, after 1945 anti-colonial movements began to challenge European authority.  Major revolts in Indochina and Algeria proved very expensive and France lost both colonies. After these conflicts, a relatively peaceful decolonization took place elsewhere after 1960.  The French Constitution of 27 October 1946 (Fourth Republic), established the French Union which endured until 1958. Newer remnants of the colonial empire were integrated into France as overseas departments and territories within the French Republic. These now total altogether 119,394 km2 (46,098 sq. miles), with 2.8 million people in 2021. By the 1960s, says Robert Aldrich, the last "vestiges of empire held little interest for the French." He argues, "Except for the traumatic decolonization of Algeria, however, what is remarkable is how few long-lasting effects on France the giving up of empire entailed." Nevertheless, French colonization dramatically impacted its colonies through policies and systems that entrenched internal strife, lack of economic diversity, aid dependency, and loss of cultural treasures. Links between France and its former colonies persist through La francophonie, the CFA franc and military operations such as Operation Serval.

History

The Americas 

During the 16th century, the French colonization of the Americas began. Excursions of Giovanni da Verrazzano and Jacques Cartier in the early 16th century, as well as the frequent voyages of French boats and fishermen to the Grand Banks off Newfoundland throughout that century, were the precursors to the story of France's colonial expansion. But Spain's defense of its American monopoly, and the further distractions caused in France itself in the later 16th century by the French Wars of Religion, prevented any constant efforts by France to settle colonies. Early French attempts to found colonies in Brazil, in 1555 at Rio de Janeiro ("France Antarctique") and in Florida (including Fort Caroline in 1562), and in 1612 at São Luís ("France Équinoxiale"), were not successful, due to a lack of official interest and to Portuguese and Spanish vigilance.

The story of France's colonial empire truly began on 27 July 1605, with the foundation of Port Royal in the colony of Acadia in North America, in what is now Nova Scotia, Canada. A few years later, in 1608, Samuel de Champlain founded Quebec, which was to become the capital of the enormous, but sparsely settled, fur-trading colony of New France (also called Canada).

New France had a rather small population, which resulted from more emphasis being placed on the fur trade rather than agricultural settlements. Due to this emphasis, the French relied heavily on creating friendly contacts with the local First Nations community. Without the appetite of New England for land, and by relying solely on Aboriginals to supply them with fur at the trading posts, the French composed a complex series of military, commercial, and diplomatic connections. These became the most enduring alliances between the French and the First Nation community. The French were, however, under pressure from religious orders to convert them to Catholicism.

Through alliances with various Native American tribes, the French were able to exert a loose control over much of the North American continent. Areas of French settlement were generally limited to the St. Lawrence River Valley. Prior to the establishment of the 1663 Sovereign Council, the territories of New France were developed as mercantile colonies. It is only after the arrival of intendant Jean Talon in 1665 that France gave its American colonies the proper means to develop population colonies comparable to that of the British. Acadia itself was lost to the British in the Treaty of Utrecht in 1713. Back in France, there was relatively little interest in colonialism, which concentrated rather on dominance within Europe, and for most of its history, New France was far behind the British North American colonies in both population and economic development.

In 1699, French territorial claims in North America expanded still further, with the foundation of Louisiana in the basin of the Mississippi River. The extensive trading network throughout the region connected to Canada through the Great Lakes, was maintained through a vast system of fortifications, many of them centred in the Illinois Country and in present-day Arkansas.

As the French empire in North America grew, the French also began to build a smaller but more profitable empire in the West Indies. Settlement along the South American coast in what is today French Guiana began in 1624, and a colony was founded on Saint Kitts in 1625 (the island had to be shared with the English until the Treaty of Utrecht in 1713, when it was ceded outright). The current isle of the Commonwealth of Dominica in the eastern Caribbean also fell under increasing French settlement from the early 1630s.  The Compagnie des Îles de l'Amérique founded colonies in Guadeloupe and Martinique in 1635, and a colony was later founded on Saint Lucia by (1650). The food-producing plantations of these colonies were built and sustained through slavery, with the supply of slaves dependent on the African slave trade. Local resistance by the indigenous peoples resulted in the Carib Expulsion of 1660. France's most important Caribbean colonial possession was established in 1664, when the colony of Saint-Domingue (today's Haiti) was founded on the western half of the Spanish island of Hispaniola. In the 18th century, Saint-Domingue grew to be the richest sugar colony in the Caribbean. The eastern half of Hispaniola (today's Dominican Republic) also came under French rule for a short period, after being given to France by Spain in 1795.

Africa and Asia 

French colonial expansion was not limited to the New World.

With the end of the French Wars of Religion, King Henry IV encouraged various enterprises, set up to develop trade with faraway lands. In December 1600, a company was formed through the association of Saint-Malo, Laval, and Vitré to trade with the Moluccas and Japan. Two ships, the Croissant and the Corbin, were sent around the Cape of Good Hope in May 1601. One was wrecked in the Maldives, leading to the adventure of François Pyrard de Laval, who managed to return to France in 1611. The second ship, carrying François Martin de Vitré, reached Ceylon and traded with Aceh in Sumatra, but was captured by the Dutch on the return leg at Cape Finisterre. François Martin de Vitré was the first Frenchman to write an account of travels to the Far East in 1604, at the request of Henry IV, and from that time numerous accounts on Asia would be published.

From 1604 to 1609, following the return of François Martin de Vitré, Henry developed a strong enthusiasm for travel to Asia and attempted to set up a French East India Company on the model of England and the Netherlands.<ref>A history of modern India, 1480–1950, Claude Markovits p. 144: The account of the experiences of François Martin de Vitré "incited the king to create a company in the image of that of the United Provinces"</ref> On 1 June 1604, he issued letters patent to Dieppe merchants to form the Dieppe Company, giving them exclusive rights to Asian trade for 15 years. No ships were sent, however, until 1616. In 1609, another adventurer, Pierre-Olivier Malherbe, returned from a circumnavigation of the globe and informed Henry of his adventures. He had visited China and India and had an encounter with Akbar.

In Senegal in West Africa, the French began to establish trading posts along the coast in 1624.

In 1664, the French East India Company was established to compete for trade in the east.

Colonies were established in India's Chandernagore (1673) and Pondichéry in the south east (1674), and later at Yanam (1723), Mahe (1725), and Karikal (1739) (see French India). Colonies were also founded in the Indian Ocean, on the Île de Bourbon (Réunion, 1664), Isle de France (Mauritius, 1718), and the Seychelles (1756).

 Colonial conflict with Britain 

In the middle of the 18th century, a series of colonial conflicts began between France and Britain, which ultimately resulted in the destruction of most of the first French colonial empire and the near-complete expulsion of France from the Americas. These wars were the War of the Austrian Succession (1740–1748), the Seven Years' War (1756–1763), the American Revolution (1775–1783), the French Revolutionary Wars (1793–1802) and the Napoleonic Wars (1803–1815). It may even be seen further back in time to the first of the French and Indian Wars. This cyclic conflict is sometimes known as the Second Hundred Years' War.

Although the War of the Austrian Succession was indecisive – despite French successes in India under the French Governor-General Joseph François Dupleix and Europe under Marshal Saxe – the Seven Years' War, after early French successes in Menorca and North America, saw a French defeat, with the numerically superior British (over one million to about 50 thousand French settlers) conquering not only New France (excluding the small islands of Saint Pierre and Miquelon), but also most of France's West Indian (Caribbean) colonies, and all of the French Indian outposts.

While the peace treaty saw France's Indian outposts, and the Caribbean islands of Martinique and Guadeloupe restored to France, the competition for influence in India had been won by the British, and North America was entirely lost – most of New France was taken by Britain (also referred to as British North America), except Louisiana, which France ceded to Spain as payment for Spain's late entrance into the war (and as compensation for Britain's annexation of Spanish Florida). Also ceded to the British were Grenada and Saint Lucia in the West Indies. Although the loss of Canada would cause much regret in future generations, it excited little unhappiness at the time; colonialism was widely regarded as both unimportant to France, and immoral.

Some recovery of the French colonial empire was made during the French intervention in the American Revolution, with Saint Lucia being returned to France by the Treaty of Paris in 1783, but not nearly as much as had been hoped for at the time of French intervention. True disaster came to what remained of France's colonial empire in 1791 when Saint Domingue (the Western third of the Caribbean island of Hispaniola), France's richest and most important colony, was riven by a massive slave revolt, caused partly by the divisions among the island's elite, which had resulted from the French Revolution of 1789.

The slaves, led eventually by Toussaint L'Ouverture and then, following his capture by the French in 1801, by Jean-Jacques Dessalines, held their own against French and British opponents. The French launched a failed expedition in 1802, and were up against a crippling Royal Naval blockade the following year. As a result, the Empire of Haiti ultimately achieved independence in 1804 (becoming the first black republic in the world, followed by Liberia in 1847). The black and mulatto population of the island (including the Spanish east) had declined from 700,000 in 1789 to 351,819 in 1804. About 80,000 Haitians died in the 1802–03 campaign alone. Of the 55,131 French soldiers dispatched to Haiti in 1802–03, 45,000, including 18 generals, had died, along with 10,000 sailors, the great majority from disease. Captain [first name unknown] Sorrell of the British navy observed, "France lost there one of the finest armies she ever sent forth, composed of picked veterans, the conquerors of Italy and of German legions. She is now entirely deprived of her influence and her power in the West Indies."

Meanwhile, France's newly resumed war with Britain resulted in the British capture of practically all remaining French colonies. These were restored at the Treaty of Amiens in 1802, but when war resumed in 1803, the British soon recaptured them. France's 1800 recovery of Louisiana from Spain in the secret Third Treaty of San Ildefonso came to nothing, as the success of the Haitian Revolution convinced Napoleon that holding Louisiana would not be worth the cost, leading to its sale to the United States in 1803. The French attempt to establish a colony in Egypt in 1798–1801 was not successful. Battle casualties for the campaign were at least 15,000 killed or wounded and 8,500 prisoners for France; 50,000 killed or wounded and 15,000 prisoners for Turkey, Egypt, other Ottoman lands, and Britain.

Second French colonial empire (after 1830)

At the close of the Napoleonic Wars, most of France's colonies were restored to it by Britain, notably Guadeloupe and Martinique in the West Indies, French Guiana on the coast of South America, various trading posts in Senegal, the Île Bourbon (Réunion) in the Indian Ocean, and France's tiny Indian possessions; however, Britain finally annexed Saint Lucia, Tobago, the Seychelles, and the Isle de France (now Mauritius).

In 1825 Charles X sent an expedition to Haïti, resulting in the Haiti indemnity controversy.

The beginnings of the second French colonial empire were laid in 1830 with the French invasion of Algeria, which was fully conquered by 1903. Historian Ben Kiernan estimates that 825,000 Algerians died during the conquest by 1875.

Franco-Tahitian War (1842–1847)

In 1838, the French naval commander Abel Aubert du Petit-Thouars responded to complaints of the mistreatment of French Catholic missionary in the Kingdom of Tahiti ruled by Queen Pōmare IV. Dupetit Thouars forced the native government to pay an indemnity and sign a treaty of friendship with France respecting the rights of French subjects in the islands including any future Catholic missionaries. Four years later, claiming the Tahitians had violated the treaty, a French protectorate was forcibly installed and the queen made to sign a request for French protection.

Queen Pōmare left her kingdom and exiled herself to Raiatea in protest against the French and tried to enlist the help of Queen Victoria. The Franco-Tahitian War broke out between the Tahitian people and the French from 1844 to 1847 as France attempted to consolidate their rule and extend their rule into the Leeward Islands where Queen Pōmare sought refuge with her relatives. The British remained officially neutral during the war but diplomatic tensions existed between the French and British. The French succeeded in subduing the guerilla forces on Tahiti but failed to hold the other islands. In February 1847, Queen Pōmare IV returned from her self-imposed exile and acquiesced to rule under the protectorate. Although victorious, the French were not able to annex the islands due to diplomatic pressure from Great Britain, so Tahiti and its dependency Moorea continued to be ruled under the protectorate. A clause to the war settlement, known as the Jarnac Convention or the Anglo-French Convention of 1847, was signed by France and Great Britain, in which the two powers agreed to respect the independence of Queen Pōmare's allies in Leeward Islands. The French continued the guise of protection until the 1880s when they formally annexed Tahiti with the abdication of King Pōmare V on 29 June 1880. The Leeward Islands were annexed through the Leewards War which ended in 1897. These conflicts and the annexation of other Pacific islands formed French Oceania.

Napoleon III: 1852–1870

Napoleon III doubled the area of the French overseas Empire; he established French rule in New Caledonia, and Cochinchina, established a protectorate in Cambodia (1863); and colonized parts of Africa.

To carry out his new overseas projects, Napoleon III created a new Ministry of the Navy and the Colonies and appointed an energetic minister, Prosper, Marquis of Chasseloup-Laubat, to head it. A key part of the enterprise was the modernization of the French Navy; he began the construction of 15 powerful new battle cruisers powered by steam and driven by propellers; and a fleet of steam-powered troop transports. The French Navy became the second most powerful in the world, after Britain's. He also created a new force of colonial troops, including elite units of naval infantry, Zouaves, the Chasseurs d'Afrique, and Algerian sharpshooters, and he expanded the Foreign Legion, which had been founded in 1831 and won fame in the Crimea, Italy and Mexico.

New Caledonia becomes a French possession (1853–54)
On 24 September 1853, Admiral Febvrier Despointes took formal possession of New Caledonia and Port-de-France (Nouméa) was founded 25 June 1854. A few dozen free settlers settled on the west coast in the following years, but New Caledonia became a penal colony and, from the 1860s until the end of the transportations in 1897, about 22,000 criminals and political prisoners were sent to New Caledonia.

Colonization of Senegal (1854–1865)

At the beginning of Napoleon III's reign, the presence of France in Senegal was limited to a trading post on the island of Gorée, a narrow strip on the coast, the town of Saint-Louis, and a handful of trading posts in the interior. The economy had largely been based on the slave trade, carried out by the rulers of the small kingdoms of the interior, until France abolished slavery in its colonies in 1848. In 1854, Napoleon III named an enterprising French officer, Louis Faidherbe, to govern and expand the colony, and to give it the beginning of a modern economy. Faidherbe built a series of forts along the Senegal River, formed alliances with leaders in the interior, and sent expeditions against those who resisted French rule. He built a new port at Dakar, established and protected telegraph lines and roads, followed these with a rail line between Dakar and Saint-Louis and another into the interior. He built schools, bridges, and systems to supply fresh water to the towns. He also introduced the large-scale cultivation of Bambara groundnuts and peanuts as a commercial crop. Reaching into the Niger valley, Senegal became the primary French base in West Africa and a model colony. Dakar became one of the most important cities of the French Empire and of Africa.

France in Indochina and the Pacific (1858–1870)

Napoleon III also acted to increase the French presence in Indochina. An important factor in his decision was the belief that France risked becoming a second-rate power by not expanding its influence in East Asia. Deeper down was the sense that France owed the world a civilizing mission.

French missionaries had been active in Vietnam since the 17th century, when the Jesuit priest Alexandre de Rhodes opened a mission there. In 1858 the Vietnamese emperor of the Nguyen dynasty felt threatened by the French influence and tried to expel the missionaries. Napoleon III sent a naval force of fourteen gunships, carrying three thousand French and three thousand Filipino troops provided by Spain, under Charles Rigault de Genouilly, to compel the government to accept the missionaries and to stop the persecution of Catholics. In September 1858 the expeditionary force captured and occupied the port of Da Nang, and then in February 1859 moved south and captured Saigon. The Vietnamese ruler was compelled to cede three provinces to France, and to offer protection to the Catholics. The French troops departed for a time to take part in the expedition to China, but in 1862, when the agreements were not fully followed by the Vietnamese emperor, they returned. The Emperor was forced to open treaty ports in Annam and Tonkin, and all of Cochinchina became a French territory in 1864.

In 1863, the ruler of Cambodia, King Norodom, who had been placed in power by the government of Thailand, rebelled against his sponsors and sought the protection of France. The Thai king granted authority over Cambodia to France, in exchange for two provinces of Laos, which were ceded by Cambodia to Thailand. In 1867, Cambodia formally became a protectorate of France.

Intervention in Syria and Lebanon (1860–1861)

In the spring of 1860, a war broke out in Lebanon, then part of the Ottoman Empire, between the quasi-Muslim Druze population and the Maronite Christians. The Ottoman authorities in Lebanon could not stop the violence, and it spread into neighboring Syria, with the massacre of many Christians. In Damascus, the Emir Abd-el-Kadr protected the Christians there against the Muslim rioters. Napoleon III felt obliged to intervene on behalf of the Christians, despite the opposition of London, which feared it would lead to a wider French presence in the Middle East. After long and difficult negotiations to obtain the approval of the British government, Napoleon III sent a French contingent of seven thousand men for a period of six months. The troops arrived in Beirut in August 1860, and took positions in the mountains between the Christian and Muslim communities. Napoleon III organized an international conference in Paris, where the country was placed under the rule of a Christian governor named by the Ottoman Sultan, which restored a fragile peace. The French troops departed in June 1861, after just under one year. The French intervention alarmed the British, but was highly popular with the powerful Catholic political faction in France, which had been alarmed by Louis Napoleon's dispute with the Pope over his territories in Italy.

Algeria

Algeria had been formally under French rule since 1830, but only in 1852 was the country entirely conquered. There were about 100,000 European settlers in the country, at that time, about half of them French. Under the Second Republic the country was ruled by a civilian government, but Louis Napoleon re-established a military government, much to the annoyance of the colonists. By 1857 the army had conquered Kabyle Province, and pacified the country. By 1860 the European population had grown to 200,000, and lands of native Algerians were being rapidly bought and farmed by the new arrivals.

Between 500,000 and 1,000,000 Algerians, out of a total of 3 million, were killed within the first three decades of the conquest as a result of war, massacres, disease and famine. French losses from 1830 to 1851 were 3,336 killed in action and 92,329 dead in the hospital.

In the first eight years of his rule Napoleon III paid little attention to Algeria. In September 1860, however, he and Empress Eugénie visited Algeria, and the trip made a deep impression upon them. Eugénie was invited to attend a traditional Arab wedding, and the Emperor met many of the local leaders. The Emperor gradually conceived the idea that Algeria should be governed differently from other colonies. In February 1863, he wrote a public letter to Pelissier, the Military Governor, saying: "Algeria is not a colony in the traditional sense, but an Arab kingdom; the local people have, like the colonists, a legal right to my protection. I am just as much the Emperor of the Arabs of Algeria as I am of the French." He intended to rule Algeria through a government of Arab aristocrats. Toward this end he invited the chiefs of main Algerian tribal groups to his chateau at Compiegne for hunting and festivities.

Compared to previous administrations, Napoleon III was far more sympathetic to the native Algerians. He halted European migration inland, restricting them to the coastal zone. He also freed the Algerian rebel leader Abd al Qadir (who had been promised freedom on surrender but was imprisoned by the previous administration) and gave him a stipend of 150,000 francs. He allowed Muslims to serve in the military and civil service on theoretically equal terms and allowed them to migrate to France. In addition, he gave the option of citizenship; however, for Muslims to take this option they had to accept all of the French civil code, including parts governing inheritance and marriage which conflicted with Muslim laws, and they had to reject the competence of religious Sharia courts. This was interpreted by some Muslims as requiring them to give up parts of their religion to obtain citizenship and was resented.

More importantly, Napoleon III changed the system of land tenure. While ostensibly well-intentioned, in effect this move destroyed the traditional system of land management and deprived many Algerians of land. While Napoleon did renounce state claims to tribal lands, he also began a process of dismantling tribal land ownership in favour of individual land ownership. This process was corrupted by French officials sympathetic to the French in Algeria who took much of the land they surveyed into public domain. In addition, many tribal leaders, chosen for loyalty to the French rather than influence in their tribe, immediately sold communal land for cash.

His attempted reforms were interrupted in 1864 by an Arab insurrection, which required more than a year and an army of 85,000 soldiers to suppress. Nonetheless, he did not give up his idea of making Algeria a model where French colonists and Arabs could live and work together as equals. He traveled to Algiers for a second time on 3 May 1865, and this time he remained for a month, meeting with tribal leaders and local officials. He offered a wide amnesty to participants of the insurrection, and promised to name Arabs to high positions in his government. He also promised a large public works program of new ports, railroads, and roads. However, once again his plans met a major natural obstacle in 1866 and 1867, Algeria was struck by an epidemic of cholera, clouds of locusts, drought and famine, and his reforms were hindered by the French colonists, who voted massively against him in the plebiscites of his late reign.

French–British relations
Despite the signing of the 1860 Cobden–Chevalier Treaty, a historic free trade agreement between Britain and France, and the joint operations conducted by France and Britain in the Crimea, China and Mexico, diplomatic relations between Britain and France never became close during the colonial era. Lord Palmerston, the British foreign minister from 1846 to 1851 and prime minister from 1855 to 1865, sought to maintain the balance of power in Europe; this rarely involved an alignment with France. In 1859 there were even briefly fears that France might try to invade Britain. Palmerston was suspicious of France's interventions in Lebanon, Southeast Asia and Mexico. Palmerston was also concerned that France might intervene in the American Civil War (1861–65) on the side of the South. The British also felt threatened by the construction of the Suez Canal (1859–1869) by Ferdinand de Lesseps in Egypt. They tried to oppose its completion by diplomatic pressures and by promoting revolts among workers.

The Suez Canal was successfully built by the French, but became a joint British-French project in 1875. Both nations saw it as vital to maintaining their influence and empires in Asia. In 1882, ongoing civil disturbances in Egypt prompted Britain to intervene, extending a hand to France. France's leading expansionist Jules Ferry was out of office, and Paris allowed London to take effective control of Egypt.

1870–1939
After the downfall of Napoleon III, few writers used the word 'empire', which had become associated with despotism, decadence, and weakness, preferring the word 'colonies'. However by the 1880s and 1890s, as Republicans consolidated their control over the political system, increasing numbers of politicians, intellectuals and writers began using the phrase "colonial empire", linking it to republicanism and the French nation.

Most Frenchmen ignored foreign affairs and colonial issues. In 1914 the chief pressure group was the Parti colonial, a coalition of 50 organizations with a combined total of only 5,000 members.L. Abrams and D. J. Miller, "Who Were the French Colonialists? A Reassessment of the Parti Colonial, 1890-1914" Historical Journal 19#3 (1976), pp. 685-725 online

Asia

It was only after its defeat in the Franco-Prussian War of 1870–1871 and the founding of the Third Republic (1871–1940) that most of France's later colonial possessions were acquired. From their base in Cochinchina, the French took over Tonkin (in modern northern Vietnam) and Annam (in modern central Vietnam) in 1884–1885. These, together with Cambodia and Cochinchina, formed French Indochina in 1887 (to which Laos was added in 1893 and Guangzhouwanin 1900).

In 1849, the French Concession in Shanghai was established, and in 1860, the French Concession in Tientsin (now called Tianjin) was set up. Both concessions lasted until 1946. The French also had smaller concessions in Guangzhou and Hankou (now part of Wuhan).

The Third Anglo-Burmese War, in which Britain conquered and annexed the hitherto independent Upper Burma, was in part motivated by British apprehension at France advancing and gaining possession of territories near to Burma.

Africa

France also extended its influence in North Africa after 1870, establishing a protectorate in Tunisia in 1881 with the Bardo Treaty. Gradually, French control crystallised over much of North, West, and Central Africa by around the start of the 20th century (including the modern states of Mauritania, Senegal, Guinea, Mali, Ivory Coast, Benin, Niger, Chad, Central African Republic, Republic of the Congo, Gabon, Cameroon, the east African coastal enclave of Djibouti (French Somaliland), and the island of Madagascar).

Pierre Savorgnan de Brazza helped to formalise French control in Gabon and on the northern banks of the Congo River from the early 1880s. The explorer Colonel Parfait-Louis Monteil traveled from Senegal to Lake Chad in 1890–1892, signing treaties of friendship and protection with the rulers of several of the countries he passed through, and gaining much knowledge of the geography and politics of the region.

The Voulet–Chanoine Mission, a military expedition, set out from Senegal in 1898 to conquer the Chad Basin and to unify all French territories in West Africa. This expedition operated jointly with two other expeditions, the Foureau-Lamy and Gentil Missions, which advanced from Algeria and Middle Congo respectively. With the death (April 1900) of the Muslim warlord Rabih az-Zubayr, the greatest ruler in the region, and the creation of the Military Territory of Chad (September 1900), the Voulet-Chanoine Mission had accomplished all its goals. The ruthlessness of the mission provoked a scandal in Paris.

As a part of the Scramble for Africa, France aimed to establish a continuous west–east axis across the continent, in contrast with the proposed British north–south axis. Tensions between Britain and France heightened in Africa. At several points war seemed possible, but no outbreak occurred. The most serious episode was the Fashoda Incident of 1898. French troops tried to claim an area in the Southern Sudan, and a British force purporting to act in the interests of the Khedive of Egypt arrived to confront them. Under heavy pressure the French withdrew, implicitly acknowledging Anglo-Egyptian control over the area. An agreement between the two states recognised the status quo: acknowledging British control over Egypt while France became the dominant power in Morocco, but France suffered a humiliating defeat overall.William L. Langer, The diplomacy of imperialism: 1890–1902 (1951) pp 537–80

During the Agadir Crisis in 1911 Britain supported France against Germany, and Morocco became a French protectorate.

Pacific islands

At this time, the French also established colonies in the South Pacific, including New Caledonia, the various island groups which make up French Polynesia (including the Society Islands, the Marquesas, the Gambier Islands, the Austral Islands and the Tuamotus), and established joint control of the New Hebrides with Britain.

Leeward Islands (1880–1897)

In contravention of the Jarnac Convention of 1847, the French placed the Leeward Islands under a provisional protectorate by falsely convincing the ruling chiefs that the German Empire planned to take over their island kingdoms. After years of diplomatic negotiation, Britain and France agreed to abrogate the convention in 1887 and the French formally annexed all the Leeward Islands without official treaties of cession from the islands' sovereign governments. From 1888 to 1897, the natives of the kingdom of Raiatea and Tahaa led by a minor chief, Teraupo'o, fought off French rule and the annexation of the Leeward Islands. Anti-French factions in the kingdom of Huahine also attempted to fight off the French under Queen Teuhe while the kingdom of Bora Bora remained neutral but hostile to the French. The conflict ended in 1897 with the capture and exile of rebel leaders to New Caledonia and more than one hundred rebels to the Marquesas. These conflicts and the annexation of other Pacific islands formed French Polynesia.

 Final gains 
The French made their last major colonial gains after World War I, when they gained mandates over the former territories of the Ottoman Empire that make up what is now Syria and Lebanon, as well as most of the former German colonies of Togo and Cameroon.

Civilising mission

A hallmark of the French colonial project in the late 19th century and early 20th century was the civilising mission (mission civilisatrice), the principle that it was Europe's duty to bring civilisation to benighted peoples. As such, colonial officials undertook a policy of Franco-Europeanisation in French colonies, most notably French West Africa and Madagascar. During the 19th century, French citizenship along with the right to elect a deputy to the French Chamber of Deputies was granted to the four old colonies of Guadeloupe, Martinique, Guyanne and Réunion as well as to the residents of the "Four Communes" in Senegal. In most cases, the elected deputies were white Frenchmen, although there were some blacks, such as the Senegalese Blaise Diagne, who was elected in 1914.

Elsewhere, in the largest and most populous colonies, a strict separation between "sujets français" (all the natives) and "citoyens français" (all males of European extraction) with different rights and duties was maintained until 1946. As was pointed out in a 1927 treatise on French colonial law, the granting of French citizenship to natives "was not a right, but rather a privilege". Two 1912 decrees dealing with French West Africa and French Equatorial Africa enumerated the conditions that a native had to meet in order to be granted French citizenship (they included speaking and writing French, earning a decent living and displaying good moral standards). From 1830 to 1946, only between 3,000 and 6,000 native Algerians were granted French citizenship. In French West Africa, outside of the Four Communes, there were 2,500 "citoyens indigènes" out of a total population of 15 million.

French conservatives had been denouncing the assimilationist policies as products of a dangerous liberal fantasy. In the Protectorate of Morocco, the French administration attempted to use urban planning and colonial education to prevent cultural mixing and to uphold the traditional society upon which the French depended for collaboration, with mixed results. After World War II, the segregationist approach modeled in Morocco had been discredited by its connections to Vichyism, and assimilationism enjoyed a brief renaissance.

David P. Forsythe wrote: "From Senegal and Mauritania in the west to Niger in the east (what became French Africa), there was a parallel series of ruinous wars, resulting in tremendous numbers of people being violently enslaved. At the beginning of the twentieth century there may have been between 3 and 3.5 million slaves, representing over 30 percent of the total population, within this sparsely populated region." In 1905, the French abolished slavery in most of French West Africa. From 1906 to 1911, over a million slaves in French West Africa fled from their masters to earlier homes. In Madagascar over 500,000 slaves were freed following French abolition in 1896.

Education
French colonial officials, influenced by the revolutionary ideal of equality, standardized schools, curricula, and teaching methods as much as possible. They did not establish colonial school systems with the idea of furthering the ambitions of the local people, but rather simply exported the systems and methods in vogue in the mother nation. Having a moderately trained lower bureaucracy was of great use to colonial officials.  The emerging French-educated indigenous elite saw little value in educating rural peoples.  After 1946 the policy was to bring the best students to Paris for advanced training. The result was to immerse the next generation of leaders in the growing anti-colonial diaspora centered in Paris. Impressionistic colonials could mingle with studious scholars or radical revolutionaries or  so everything in between. Ho Chi Minh and other young radicals in Paris formed the French Communist party in 1920.

Tunisia was exceptional. The colony was administered by Paul Cambon, who built an educational system for colonists and indigenous people alike that was closely modeled on mainland France. He emphasized female and vocational education.  By independence, the quality of Tunisian education nearly equalled that in France.

African nationalists rejected such a public education system, which they perceived as an attempt to retard African development and maintain colonial superiority. One of the first demands of the emerging nationalist movement after World War II was the introduction of full metropolitan-style education in French West Africa with its promise of equality with Europeans.David E.  Gardinier, "Schooling in the states of equatorial Africa." Canadian Journal of African Studies/La Revue canadienne des études africaines 8.3 (1974): 517-538.

In Algeria, the debate was polarized. The French set up schools based on the scientific method and French culture. The Pied-Noir (Catholic migrants from Europe) welcomed  this. Those goals were rejected by the Moslem Arabs, who prized mental agility and their distinctive religious tradition. The Arabs refused to become patriotic and cultured Frenchmen and a unified educational system was impossible until the Pied-Noir and their Arab allies went into exile after 1962.

In South Vietnam from 1955 to 1975 there were two competing powers in education, as the French continued their work and the Americans moved in. They sharply disagreed on goals. The French educators sought to preserving French culture among the Vietnamese elites and relied on the Mission Culturelle – the heir of the colonial Direction of Education – and its prestigious high schools. The Americans looked at the great mass of people and sought to make South Vietnam a nation strong enough to stop communism. The Americans had far more money, as USAID coordinated and funded the activities of expert teams, and particularly of academic missions. The French deeply resented the American invasion of their historical zone of cultural imperialism.

Critics of French colonialism
Critics of French colonialism gained an international audience in the 1920s, and often used documentary reportage and access to agencies such as the League of Nations and the International Labour Organization to make their protests heard. The main criticism was the high level of violence and suffering among the natives. Major critics included Albert Londres, Félicien Challaye, and Paul Monet, whose books and articles were widely read.

While the first stages of a takeover often involved the destruction of historic buildings in order to use the site for French headquarters, archaeologists and art historians soon engaged in systematic effort to identify, map and preserve historic sites, especially temples such as Angkor Wat, Champa ruins and the temples of Luang Prabang. Many French museums have collections of colonial materials. Since the 1980s the French government has opened new museums of colonial artifacts including the Musée du Quai Branly and the Cité Nationale de l’Histoire de l’Immigration, in Paris; and the Maison des Civilisations et de l’Unité Réunionnaise in Réunion.

Revolt in North Africa against Spain and France

The Berber independence leader Abd el-Krim (1882–1963) organized armed resistance against the Spanish and French for control of Morocco. The Spanish had faced unrest off and on from the 1890s, but in 1921 Spanish forces were massacred at the Battle of Annual. El-Krim founded an independent Rif Republic that operated until 1926 but had no international recognition. Paris and Madrid agreed to collaborate to destroy it. They sent in 200,000 soldiers, forcing el-Krim to surrender in 1926; he was exiled in the Pacific until 1947.  Morocco became quiet, and in 1936 became the base from which Francisco Franco launched his revolt against Madrid.

World War II

During World War II, allied Free France, often with British support, and Axis-aligned Vichy France struggled for control of the colonies, sometimes with outright military combat. By 1943, all of the colonies, except for Indochina under Japanese control, had joined the Free French cause.

The overseas empire helped liberate France as 300,000 North African Arabs fought in the ranks of the Free French. However Charles de Gaulle had no intention of liberating the colonies. He assembled the conference of colonial governors (excluding the nationalist leaders) in Brazzaville in January 1944 to announce plans for postwar Union that would replace the Empire. The Brazzaville manifesto proclaimed:
 the goals of the work of civilization undertaken by France in the colonies exclude all idea of autonomy, all possibility of development outside the French block of the Empire; the possible constitutional self-government in the colonies is to be dismissed.

The manifesto angered nationalists across the Empire, and set the stage for long-term wars in Indochina and Algeria that France would lose in humiliating fashion.

Decolonization

The French colonial empire began to fall during the Second World War, when various parts were occupied by foreign powers (Japan in Indochina, Britain in Syria, Lebanon, and Madagascar, the United States and Britain in Morocco and Algeria, and Germany and Italy in Tunisia). However, control was gradually reestablished by Charles de Gaulle. The French Union, included in the Constitution of 1946, nominally replaced the former colonial empire, but officials in Paris remained in full control. The colonies were given local assemblies with only limited local power and budgets. There emerged a group of elites, known as evolués, who were natives of the overseas territories but lived in metropolitan France.

Conflict
France was immediately confronted with the beginnings of the decolonisation movement. In Algeria demonstrations in May 1945 were repressed with an estimated 6,000 to 45,000 Algerians killed. Unrest in Haiphong, Indochina, in November 1945 was met by a warship bombarding the city. Paul Ramadier's (SFIO) cabinet repressed the Malagasy Uprising in Madagascar in 1947.  The French blamed education. French officials estimated the number of Malagasy killed from a low of 11,000 to a French Army estimate of 89,000.

Also in Indochina, Ho Chi Minh's Viet Minh, which was backed by the Soviet Union and China, declared Vietnam's independence, which started the First Indochina War. The war dragged on until 1954, when the Viet Minh decisively defeated the French at the Battle of Điện Biên Phủ in northern Vietnam, which was the last major battle between the French and the Vietnamese in the First Indochina War.

Following the Vietnamese victory at Điện Biên Phủ and the signing of the 1954 Geneva Accords, France agreed to withdraw its forces from all its colonies in French Indochina, while stipulating that Vietnam would be temporarily divided at the 17th parallel, with control of the north given to the Soviet-backed Viet Minh as the Democratic Republic of Vietnam under Ho Chi Minh, and the south becoming the State of Vietnam under former Nguyen-dynasty Emperor Bảo Đại, who abdicated following the 1945 August Revolution under pressure from Ho. However, in 1955, the State of Vietnam's Prime Minister, Ngô Đình Diệm, toppled Bảo Đại in a fraud-ridden referendum and proclaimed himself president of the new Republic of Vietnam. The refusal of Ngô Đình Diệm, the US-supported president of the first Republic of Vietnam [RVN], to allow elections in 1956 – as had been stipulated by the Geneva Conference – in fear of Ho Chi Minh's victory and subsequently a total communist takeover, eventually led to the Vietnam War.

In France's African colonies, the Union of the Peoples of Cameroon's insurrection, which started in 1955 and headed by Ruben Um Nyobé, was violently repressed over a two-year period, with perhaps as many as 100 people killed. However, France formally relinquished its protectorate over Morocco and granted it independence in 1956.

French involvement in Algeria stretched back a century. The movements of Ferhat Abbas and Messali Hadj had marked the period between the two world wars, but both sides radicalised after the Second World War. In 1945, the Sétif massacre was carried out by the French army.  The Algerian War started in 1954. Atrocities characterized both sides, and the number killed became highly controversial estimates that were made for propaganda purposes. Algeria was a three-way conflict due to the large number of "pieds-noirs" (Europeans who had settled there in the 125 years of French rule). The political crisis in France caused the collapse of the Fourth Republic, as Charles de Gaulle returned to power in 1958 and finally pulled the French soldiers and settlers out of Algeria by 1962.James McDougall, "The Impossible Republic: The Reconquest of Algeria and the Decolonization of France, 1945–1962," Journal of Modern History 89#4 (2017) pp 772–811 excerpt

The French Union was replaced in the Constitution of 1958 by the French Community. Only Guinea refused by referendum to take part in the new organisation. However, the French Community ceased to operate before the end of the Algerian War.  Almost all of the other former African colonies achieved independence in 1960.  The French government refused to allow the populations of the former colonies the right they had in the new French Constitution of 1958, as French citizens with equal rights, to choose for their territories to become full départements of France.  The French government had ensured that a constitutional law (60-525) was passed which removed the need for a referendum in a territory to confirm a change in status towards independence or départementalisation, so the voters who had rejected independence in 1958 were not consulted about it in 1960. There are still a few former colonies that chose to remain part of France, under the status of overseas départements or territories.

Critics of neocolonialism claimed that the Françafrique had replaced formal direct rule. They argued that while de Gaulle was granting independence on one hand, he was maintaining French dominance through the operations of Jacques Foccart, his counsellor for African matters. Foccart supported in particular Biafra in the Nigerian Civil War during the late 1960s.

Robert Aldrich argues that with Algerian independence in 1962, it appeared that the Empire practically had come to an end, as the remaining colonies were quite small and lacked active nationalist movements. However, there was trouble in French Somaliland (Djibouti), which became independent in 1977. There also were complications and delays in the New Hebrides Vanuatu, which was the last to gain independence in 1980. New Caledonia remains a special case under French suzerainty. The Indian Ocean island of Mayotte voted in referendum in 1974 to retain its link with France and not become independent like the other three islands of the Comoro archipelago.

Demographics

French census statistics from 1936 show an imperial population, outside of Metropolitan France itself, of 69.1 million people. Of the total population, 16.1 million lived in North Africa, 25.5 million in sub-Saharan Africa, 3.2 million in the Middle East, 0.3 million in the Indian subcontinent, 23.2 million in East and South-East Asia, 0.15 million in the South Pacific, and 0.6 million in the Caribbean.

The largest colonies were the general governorate of French Indochina (grouping five separate colonies and protectorates), with 23.0 million, the general governorate of French West Africa (grouping eight separate colonies), with 14.9 million, the general governorate of Algeria (grouping three departments and four Saharan territories), with 7.2 million, the protectorate of Morocco, with 6.3 million, the general governorate of French Equatorial Africa (grouping four separate colonies), with 3.9 million, and Madagascar and Dependencies (incl. the Comoro Islands), with 3.8 million.

2.7 million Europeans (French and non-French citizens) and assimilated natives (non-European French citizens) lived in the French colonial empire in 1936 besides 66.4 million non-assimilated natives (French subjects but not citizens). The majority of Europeans lived in North Africa. Non-European French citizens lived essentially in the four "old colonies" (Réunion, Martinique, Guadeloupe, and French Guiana), as well as in the Four Communes of Senegal (Saint-Louis, Dakar, Gorée, and Rufisque) and in the colonies of the South Pacific.

French settlers
Unlike elsewhere in Europe, France experienced relatively low levels of emigration to the Americas, except for the Huguenots in British or Dutch colonies. France generally had close to the slowest natural population growth in Europe, and emigration pressures were therefore quite small. A small but significant emigration, numbering only in the tens of thousands, of mainly Roman Catholic French populations led to the settlement of the provinces of Acadia, Canada and Louisiana, both (at the time) French possessions, and colonies in the West Indies, Mascarene islands and Africa. In New France, Huguenots were banned from settling in the territory, and Quebec was one of the most staunchly Catholic areas in the world until the Quiet Revolution. The current French Canadian population, which numbers in the millions, is descended almost entirely from New France's small settler population.

On 31 December 1687 a community of French Huguenots settled in South Africa. Most of these originally settled in the Cape Colony, but have since been quickly absorbed into the Afrikaner population. After Champlain's founding of Quebec City in 1608, it became the capital of New France. Encouraging settlement was difficult, and while some immigration did occur, by 1763 New France only had a population of some 65,000.

In 1787, there were 30,000 white colonists on France's colony of Saint-Domingue. In 1804 Dessalines, the first ruler of an independent Haiti (St. Domingue), ordered the massacre of whites remaining on the island. Out of the 40,000 inhabitants on Guadeloupe, at the end of the 17th century, there were more than 26,000 blacks and 9,000 whites. Bill Marshall wrote, "The first French effort to colonize Guiana, in 1763, failed utterly when tropical diseases and climate killed all but 2,000 of the initial 12,000 settlers."

French law made it easy for thousands of colons, ethnic or national French from former colonies of North and West Africa, India and Indochina to live in mainland France. It is estimated that 20,000 colons were living in Saigon in 1945. 1.6 million European pieds noirs migrated from Algeria, Tunisia and Morocco. In just a few months in 1962, 900,000 French Algerians left Algeria in the largest relocation of population in Europe since World War II. In the 1970s, over 30,000 French colons left Cambodia during the Khmer Rouge regime as the Pol Pot government confiscated their farms and land properties. In November 2004, several thousand of the estimated 14,000 French nationals in Ivory Coast left the country after days of anti-white violence.

Apart from French-Canadians (Québécois and Acadians), francophone Louisianians (Cajuns and Louisiana Creoles), and Métis, other populations of French ancestry outside metropolitan France include the Caldoches of New Caledonia, the so-called Zoreilles, Petits-blancs with the Franco-Mauritian of various Indian Ocean islands and the Beke people of the French West Indies.

Territories
 Africa 

 French Algeria 
 French Protectorate in Morocco
 French Protectorate of Tunisia
 French West Africa
 French Mauritania
 French Senegal
 French Guinea
 French Ivory Coast
 French Niger
 French Upper Volta
 French Dahomey
 French Togoland
 French Sudan
 French Equatorial Africa
 French Gabon
 French Congo
 Ubangui-Shari
 French Chad
 French Cameroon
 French Madagascar
 Seychelles
 Île de France (Mauritius)
 Comoros
 Mayotte 
 Réunion 
 Kerguelen 
 Île Saint-Paul 
 Amsterdam Island 
 Crozet Islands 
 Bassas da India 
 Europa Island 
 Juan de Nova Island 
 Glorioso Islands 
 Tromelin 
 French Somalia
 French domains of St Helena

Asia

 French mandate of Syria
 Greater Lebanon
 French India
 * French Indochina
 French Cochinchina 
 Tonkin 
 Annam 
 French protectorate of Cambodia
 French protectorate of Laos
 China enclaves
 French concession in Tianjin
 Shanghai French Concession
 Guangzhouwan

The Caribbean

 Commonwealth of Dominica
 Saint Lucia
 Grenada
 Saint-Domingue
 Trinidad and Tobago
 Virgin Islands
 Martinique 
 Guadeloupe
 Saint Barthélemy
 Saint Martin

South America
 France Antarctique
 French Guiana
 Equinoctial France

North America
 New France
 Acadia
 United States
 Canada
 Louisiana
 Saint Pierre and Miquelon

Oceania
 New Caledonia
 French Polynesia
 Wallis and Futuna
 Clipperton Island
 Vanuatu

See also
 Army of the Levant
CFA franc
 Colonialism
 Decolonization
 Evolution of the French Empire
 Francization
 French Army units with a tradition of service overseas
 1900–1958: Troupes de marine
 1900–1958: Troupes coloniales
 Tirailleurs
 Spahis
 Zouaves
 French colonial flags
 French colonisation of the Americas
 French law on colonialism (for teachers, 2005)
 History of France
 Second French Empire
 French Third Republic
 Kingdom of France
 International relations of the Great Powers (1814–1919)
 List of French possessions and colonies
 New France
 Organisation internationale de la Francophonie
 Overseas France 
 Postage stamps of the French colonies
 Scramble for Africa
 Timeline of imperialism

 References 

Further reading
 Langley, Michael. "Bizerta to the Bight: The French in Africa."  History Today. (Oct 1972), pp 733–739. covers 1798 to 1900.
 Hutton, Patrick H. ed. Historical Dictionary of the Third French Republic, 1870–1940 (2 vol 1986).
 Northcutt, Wayne, ed. Historical Dictionary of the French Fourth and Fifth Republics, 1946–1991 (1992).

Policies and colonies
 Aldrich, Robert. Greater France: A History of French Overseas Expansion (1996)
 Aldrich, Robert. The French Presence in the South Pacific, 1842–1940 (1989).
 Anderson, Fred. Crucible of War: The Seven Years' War and the Fate of Empire in British North America, 1754–1766 (2001), covers New France in Canada
 Baumgart, Winfried. Imperialism: The Idea and Reality of British and French Colonial Expansion, 1880–1914 (1982)
 Betts, Raymond. Tricouleur: The French Overseas Empire (1978), 174pp
 Betts, Raymond. Assimilation and Association in French Colonial Theory, 1890–1914 (2005) excerpt and text search
 .
 
 Clayton, Anthony. The Wars of French Decolonization (1995)
 Cogneau, Denis, et al. "Taxation in Africa from Colonial Times to Present Evidence from former French colonies 1900-2018." (2021): online
 Conklin, Alice L. A Mission to Civilize: The Republican Idea of Empire in France and West Africa, 1895–1930 (1997) 

 Evans, Martin. "From colonialism to post-colonialism: the French empire since Napoleon." in Martin S. Alexander, ed., French History since Napoleon (1999) pp: 391–415.
 Gamble, Harry. Contesting French West Africa: Battles over Schools and the Colonial Order, 1900–1950 (U of Nebraska Press, 2017).  378 pp. online review
 Jennings, Eric T. Imperial Heights: Dalat and the Making and Undoing of French Indochina (2010).
 
 Lawrence, Adria. Imperial rule and the politics of nationalism: anti-colonial protest in the French empire (Cambridge UP, 2013).
 .
 Klein, Martin A. Slavery and colonial rule in French West Africa (Cambridge University Press, 1998)
 Manning, Patrick. Francophone Sub-Saharan Africa 1880-1995 (Cambridge UP, 1998).
 Neres, Philip. French-speaking West Africa: From Colonial Status to Independence (1962)
 Priestley, Herbert Ingram. France overseas: a study of modern imperialism (1938) 464pp.
 Quinn, Frederick. The French Overseas Empire (2000) 
 .
 Poddar, Prem, and Lars Jensen, eds., A historical companion to postcolonial literatures: Continental Europe and Its Empires (Edinburgh UP, 2008), excerpt also entire text online
 .
 Priestley, Herbert Ingram. (1938) France overseas;: A study of modern imperialism 463pp; encyclopedic coverage as of late 1930s
 Roberts, Stephen H. History of French Colonial Policy (1870-1925) (2 vol 1929) vol 1 online also vol 2 online; Comprehensive scholarly history
 .
 Strother, Christian. "Waging War on Mosquitoes: Scientific Research and the Formation of Mosquito Brigades in French West Africa, 1899–1920." Journal of the history of medicine and allied sciences (2016): jrw005.
 Thomas, Martin. The French Empire Between the Wars: Imperialism, Politics and Society (2007) covers 1919–1939
 Thompson, Virginia, and Richard Adloff. French West Africa (Stanford UP, 1958).
 Wellington, Donald C. French East India companies: A historical account and record of trade (Hamilton Books, 2006)
 Wesseling, H.L. and Arnold J. Pomerans. Divide and rule: The partition of Africa, 1880–1914 (Praeger, 1996.) 
 Wesseling, H.L. The European Colonial Empires: 1815–1919 (Routledge, 2015).

Decolonization
 Betts, Raymond F. Decolonization (2nd ed. 2004)
 Betts, Raymond F. France and Decolonisation, 1900–1960 (1991)
 Chafer, Tony. The end of empire in French West Africa: France's successful decolonization (Bloomsbury Publishing, 2002).
 Chamberlain, Muriel E. ed. Longman Companion to European Decolonisation in the Twentieth Century (Routledge, 2014)
 Clayton, Anthony. The wars of French decolonization (Routledge, 2014).
 Cooper, Frederick. "French Africa, 1947–48: Reform, Violence, and Uncertainty in a Colonial Situation." Critical Inquiry  (2014) 40#4 pp: 466–478. in JSTOR
 Ikeda, Ryo. The Imperialism of French Decolonisation: French Policy and the Anglo-American Response in Tunisia and Morocco (Palgrave Macmillan, 2015)
 Jansen, Jan C. & Jürgen Osterhammel. Decolonization: A Short History (princeton UP, 2017). online
 Jones, Max, et al. "Decolonising imperial heroes: Britain and France." Journal of Imperial and Commonwealth History 42#5 (2014): 787–825.
 Lawrence, Adria K. Imperial Rule and the Politics of Nationalism:  Anti-Colonial Protest in the French Empire (Cambridge UP, 2013) online reviews
 McDougall, James. "The Impossible Republic: The Reconquest of Algeria and the Decolonization of France, 1945–1962," The Journal of Modern History 89#4 (December 2017) pp 772–811 excerpt
 Rothermund, Dietmar. Memories of Post-Imperial Nations: The Aftermath of Decolonization, 1945–2013 (2015) excerpt; Compares the impact on Great Britain, the Netherlands, Belgium, France, Portugal, Italy and Japan
 Rothermund, Dietmar. The Routledge companion to decolonization (Routledge, 2006), comprehensive global coverage; 365pp
 Shepard, Todd. The Invention of Decolonization: The Algerian War and the Remaking of France (2006)
 Simpson, Alfred William Brian. Human Rights and the End of Empire: Britain and the Genesis of the European Convention (Oxford University Press, 2004).
 Smith, Tony. "A comparative study of French and British decolonization". Comparative Studies in Society and History (1978) 20#1 pp: 70–102. online 
 Smith, Tony. "The French Colonial Consensus and People's War, 1946–58." Journal of Contemporary History (1974): 217–247. in JSTOR
 Thomas, Martin, Bob Moore, and Lawrence J. Butler. Crises of Empire: Decolonization and Europe's imperial states (Bloomsbury Publishing, 2015)
 Von Albertini, Rudolf. Decolonization: the Administration and Future of the Colonies, 1919–1960 (Doubleday, 1971), scholarly analysis of French policies, pp 265–469..

Images and impact on France
 Andrew, Christopher M., and Alexander Sydney Kanya-Forstner. "France, Africa, and the First World War." Journal of African History 19.1 (1978): 11–23.
 . online
 Andrew, C. M., and A. S. Kanya-Forstner. "The French 'Colonial Party': Its Composition, Aims and Influence, 1885–1914." Historical Journal 14#1 (1971): 99–128. online.
 August, Thomas G. The Selling of the Empire: British and French Imperialist Propaganda, 1890–1940 (1985)
 Chafer, Tony, and Amanda Sackur. Promoting the Colonial Idea: Propaganda and Visions of Empire in France (2002)
 .
 Conkin, Alice L. A Mission to Civilize: The Republican Idea of Empire in France and West Africa, 1895–1930 (1997) * Dobie, Madeleine. Trading Places: Colonization & Slavery in 18th-Century French Culture (2010)
 .
 Rosenblum, Mort. Mission to Civilize: The French Way (1986) online review
 Rothermund, Dietmar. Memories of Post-Imperial Nations: The Aftermath of Decolonization, 1945–2013 (2015) excerpt; Compares the impact on Great Britain, the Netherlands, Belgium, France, Portugal, Italy and Japan.
 Singer, Barnett, and John Langdon. Cultured Force: Makers and Defenders of the French Colonial Empire (2008)
 Thomas, Martin, ed. The French Colonial Mind, Volume 1: Mental Maps of Empire and Colonial Encounters (France Overseas: Studies in Empire and D) (2012); The French Colonial Mind, Volume 2: Violence, Military Encounters, and Colonialism (2012).

Historiography and memoir
 Bennington, Alice. "Writing Empire? The Reception of Post-Colonial Studies in France". Historical Journal (2016) 59#4: 1157–1186. abstract
 Dubois, Laurent. "The French Atlantic", in Atlantic History: A Critical Appraisal, ed. by Jack P. Greene and Philip D. Morgan, (Oxford UP, 2009) pp. 137–61.
 Dwyer, Philip. "Remembering and Forgetting in Contemporary France: Napoleon, Slavery, and the French History Wars", French Politics, Culture & Society (2008) 26#3 pp 110–122.
 .
 Greer, Allan. "National, Transnational, and Hypernational Historiographies: New France Meets Early American History", Canadian Historical Review, (2010) 91#4 pp 695–724, in Project MUSE
 Hodson, Christopher, and Brett Rushforth, "Absolutely Atlantic: Colonialism and the Early Modern French State in Recent Historiography", History Compass, (January 2010) 8#1 pp 101–117
 Lawrence, Adria K. Imperial Rule and the Politics of Nationalism: Anti-Colonial Protest in the French Empire'' (Cambridge UP, 2013) online reviews

External links

 French Colonial Historical Society
 H-FRANCE, daily discussions and book reviews 
 French Colonial Historical Society
 French Colonial History an annual volume of refereed, scholarly articles

Former empires
 
 
History of European colonialism
Overseas empires
1534 establishments in the French colonial empire
1977 disestablishments in the French colonial empire
Historical transcontinental empires